Mohammad Sadeqi (born 8 January 2004) is an Afghan-Austrian professional footballer who plays as a midfielder for 2. Liga club Liefering.

Club career
Sadeqi started his career with SU Roppen, followed by a short spell with Wacker Innsbruck, before joining the academy of Red Bull Salzburg.

International career
Sadeqi is eligible to represent Austria and Afghanistan at international level.

Career statistics

Club

Notes

References

2004 births
Living people
Austrian footballers
Afghan footballers
Austrian people of Afghan descent
Association football midfielders
2. Liga (Austria) players
FC Wacker Innsbruck (2002) players
FC Red Bull Salzburg players
FC Liefering players